First Sergeant Maximo Yabes (January 29, 1932 – February 26, 1967) born in Lodi, California, was a United States Army soldier who posthumously received the Medal of Honor — the United States' highest military decoration — for his actions near Phu Hoa Dong in South Vietnam during the Vietnam War. Yabes distinguished himself when he used his body as a shield to protect others in a bunker, moved two wounded men to a safer position where they could be given medical treatment and destroyed an enemy machine gun position before being mortally wounded.

Early years
Yabes was born in Lodi, California, and at a young age moved with his family to Oakridge, Oregon where he received his primary and secondary education. In 1950, he dropped out of Oakridge High School and joined the United States Army.

Vietnam War
By 1967, Yabes was a First Sergeant with a total of 17 years in the Army.  He was assigned to Company A, 4th Battalion, 9th Infantry, of the 25th Infantry Division in South Vietnam. The division had been stationed at Củ Chi Base Camp, northwest of Saigon since January 1966. 

Yabes' company — Alpha Company — was assigned to protect a squad of Army engineers whose assignment was to bulldoze a swath between the village and a plantation.

On February 26, 1967, waves of Vietcong, attacked Company A's position, blowing whistles and laying down deadly automatic weapons fire. The Vietcong, who penetrated the barbed wire perimeter, hurled grenades towards the command bunker. Yabes ran inside the bunker and covered its occupants with his body, all the while receiving wounds from numerous grenade fragments. Yabes then moved to another bunker and with a grenade launcher fired upon the enemy, halting a further penetration of the perimeter. Yabes then assisted two fallen comrades before he noticed an enemy machinegun within the perimeter which threatened the whole position.  Yabes then proceeded to attack the enemy machine gun crew.  He was able to kill the entire crew before falling mortally wounded. 24 American soldiers and over 113 Vietcong were killed in the attack.

Secretary of the Army, Stanley Resor, presented Yabes' wife and children with the Medal of Honor in a ceremony held at the Pentagon in October 1968.

Medal of Honor citation

Citation:
For conspicuous gallantry and intrepidity at the risk of his life above and beyond the call of duty. 1st Sgt. Yabes distinguished himself with Company A, which was providing security for a land clearing operation. Early in the morning the company suddenly came under intense automatic weapons and mortar fire followed by a battalion sized assault from 3 sides. Penetrating the defensive perimeter the enemy advanced on the company command post bunker. The command post received increasingly heavy fire and was in danger of being overwhelmed. When several enemy grenades landed within the command post, 1st Sgt. Yabes shouted a warning and used his body as a shield to protect others in the bunker. Although painfully wounded by numerous grenade fragments, and despite the vicious enemy fire on the bunker, he remained there to provide covering fire and enable the others in the command group to relocate. When the command group had reached a new position, 1st Sgt. Yabes moved through a withering hail of enemy fire to another bunker 50 meters away. There he secured a grenade launcher from a fallen comrade and fired point blank into the attacking Viet Cong stopping further penetration of the perimeter. Noting 2 wounded men helpless in the fire swept area, he moved them to a safer position where they could be given medical treatment. He resumed his accurate and effective fire killing several enemy soldiers and forcing others to withdraw from the vicinity of the command post. As the battle continued, he observed an enemy machinegun within the perimeter which threatened the whole position. On his own, he dashed across the exposed area, assaulted the machinegun, killed the crew, destroyed the weapon, and fell mortally wounded. 1st Sgt. Yabes' valiant and selfless actions saved the lives of many of his fellow soldiers and inspired his comrades to effectively repel the enemy assault. His indomitable fighting spirit, extraordinary courage and intrepidity at the cost of his life are in the highest military traditions and reflect great credit upon himself and the Armed Forces of his country.

Honors
First Sergeant Maximo Yabes was buried with full military honors at Fort Logan National Cemetery in Denver, Colorado.

Dozens of individuals, businesses and organizations in Oakridge, Oregon, donated time, money, labor and supplies to build a memorial to honor Yabes. They hired sculptor Tim Outman to create the memorial which features a fountain, a flag pole and a bronze bust with the likeness of Yabes set on a granite pedestal. Engraved on the base are the details of Yabes' Medal of Honor exploits. The memorial is located in Oakridge in the Greenwaters Park.  Greenwaters Park is located on the east side of Oakridge, south of highway 58.  The city of El Paso, Texas also honored Yabes by naming an avenue after him.  His name can be found on panel 15E, line 102 of the Vietnam Memorial Wall in Washington, D.C.

Awards and recognitions
Among Maximo Yabes' decorations and medals were the following:

See also

List of Medal of Honor recipients
List of Medal of Honor recipients for the Vietnam War
Hispanic Medal of Honor recipients

Notes

Further reading
References to First Sergeant Maximo Yabes exploits can be found in the following books:

External links

1932 births
1967 deaths
American military personnel killed in the Vietnam War
United States Army Medal of Honor recipients
American people of Mexican descent
United States Army non-commissioned officers
People from Oakridge, Oregon
People from Lodi, California
Vietnam War recipients of the Medal of Honor
Burials at Fort Logan National Cemetery
United States Army personnel of the Vietnam War